Shshikant Sutar is an Indian politician and member of the Shiv Sena. He was the member of the Maharashtra Legislative Assembly in 1990 and 1995 from the Shivajinagar Assembly Constituency in Pune.

Positions held 
 1990: Elected to Maharashtra Legislative Assembly 
 1995: Elected to Maharashtra Legislative Assembly
 1995: Cabinet Minister for Agriculture and Water Conservation, Government of Maharashtra
 2018: Appointed as Deputy Leader of Shiv Sena Party

References 

Politicians from Pune
Shiv Sena politicians
Members of the Maharashtra Legislative Assembly
Living people
Marathi politicians
Year of birth missing (living people)